The 2010 FIBA Asia Under-18 Championship qualification was held in late 2009 and early 2010 with the Persian Gulf region, West Asia, Southeast Asia, East Asia and Middle Asia (Central Asia and South Asia) each conducting tournaments.

Qualification format
The following are eligible to participate:

 The organizing country.
 The champion team from the previous FIBA Asia Under-18 Championship.
 The four best-placed teams from the previous FIBA Asia Under-18 Championship will qualify the same number of teams from their respective sub-zones.
 The two best teams from the sub-zones.

2008 FIBA Asia Under-18 Championship

Qualified teams

East Asia
All the others withdrew, so ,,, qualified automatically.

Gulf
The Gulf U-17 Basketball Championship is the qualifying tournament for the 2010 FIBA Asia Under-18 Championship. it also serves as a regional championship. The two best teams qualifies for 2010 FIBA Asia Under-18 Championship.

Preliminary round

Middle Asia – SAARC
The 2010 Middle Asia – SAARC qualifying tournament was held from August 12 to 14, 2010 in Bangalore, India. The two best teams qualifies for 2010 FIBA Asia Under-18 Championship.

Preliminary round

Middle Asia – Stans
All the others withdrew, so  qualified automatically.

Southeast Asia
The 2010 SEABA Under-18 Championship is the qualifying tournament for the 2010 FIBA Asia Under-18 Championship; it also serves as a regional championship involving Southeast Asian basketball teams. It was held on June 5 to June 9, 2010, at Yangon, Myanmar. The top two finishers qualifies to the 2010 FIBA Asia Under-18 Championship.

Preliminary round

West Asia
The 2010 WABA Under-18 Championship is the qualifying tournament for the 2010 FIBA Asia Under-18 Championship. It also serves as a regional championship involving West Asian basketball teams. the four best teams excluding Yemen qualifies for 2010 FIBA Asia Under-18 Championship. The tournament was held from April 19 to April 24, 2010, in Beirut, Lebanon.

Preliminary round

 

 

FIBA Asia Under-18 Championship qualification
2010 FIBA Asia Under-18 Championship
2009–10 in Asian basketball